Scott Rettich (born September 7, 1984 in Dayton, Ohio, deceased April 12, 2022) was an American racing driver, competing in such disciplines as the U.S. F2000 National Championship in the National class.

Career history

Karting

Scott Rettich started karting in 1996.  Between 1998 and 2004 Scott Rettich entered the Ohio Valley Karting Club championship collecting 5 titles in various classes. Throughout his karting career Scott entered the WKA Manufacturer's Cup and Gold Cup. Scott Rettich won 5 championships, 4 in the Gold Cup and 1 in the Manufacturer's Cup. Between 2000 and 2005 Rettich was factory driver for Italian kart manufacturer Energy. And from 2003 until 2005 he also drove for Margay.

Auto racing

The first taste of motorsport for Scott Rettich was the 2005 SCCA June Sprints. Scott entered in the Spec Racer Ford class but did not finish the race. For 2006 Scott raced in the SCCA Central Division in the Formula Mazda and Spec Racer Ford class for Kerin Motorsports. He won the championship in the Formula Mazda class winning 5 out of 10 races. He also won the Formula Mazda June Sprints and the Runoffs, thus winning the SCCA Triple Crown. He scored a second place in the Spec Racer Ford championship.

Scott Rettich made his pro racing debut in 2007 with Mundill Racing in the Star Mazda championship. Scott started 9 out of 12 races in the season. He scored 3 top 10 finishes and scoring a 16th place in the championship. He was the best scoring driver for Mundill Racing, but also the one with the most entries. For 2008 he stayed with Mundill Racing in the Star Mazda championship, this time for a full season entry. His best finish was now a fifth place at Road Atlanta. In the final ranking Scott finished 11th.

2009 marked a comeback in SCCA club racing for Scott Rettich. He raced in the SCCA Great Lakes Division in the Spec Racer Ford and Formula Enterprises class for Hippi Racing. Scott Rettich won both titles and the Formula Enterprises June Sprints. The next season was extremely successful for Scott. Driving for Hippi Racing Scott won the revived SCCA Spec Racer Ford Pro Series and scored a second place in the SCCA Pro Formula Enterprises (behind Sean Rayhall). He also swept the SCCA Triple Crown winning the Great Lakes championship, June Sprints and Runoffs.

Rettich founded Alliance Autosport in 2011. Alliance Autosport made its debut at the 2011 24 Hours of Daytona in the GT class. The Porsche 911 GT3 997 was driven by Scott Rettich and Formula Enterprises rival Matthew Schneider. They start 29th and finished 20th. Scott returned to the Grand-Am Road Racing GT class at Watkins Glen driving for Racers Edge Motorsports in a Mazda RX-8. Alliance Autosport fielded Scott Rettich in the SCCA Pro Formula Enterprises and the SCCA Spec Racer Ford Pro Series. Rettich won the SCCA Pro Formula Enterprises in an impressive way winning 9 out of 10 races, the other race was won by Matthew Schneider.

The 2012 season started with the 2012 24 Hours of Daytona Scott Rettich joined Matthew Schneider, Jon Miller, Darryl Shoff and Hal Prewitt at Daytona. Starting 31st the team finished 28th, 41st overall. Rettich ran a partial season in the 2012 U.S. F2000 National Championship National class driving a Van Diemen DP06 Formula Enterprises car. He achieved 4 podiums in 6 races and was placed 8th in the standings. Rettich won the Great Lakes Division Formula Enterprises championship, just like in 2011, 2010 and 2009.

Death

On April 12th, 2022, Rettich passed away unexpectedly at his home, aged 37. His memorial service was held on the 23rd. In his memory, the NR2003 league Maverick Cup Series ran the Scott Rettich Sonoma 70.

Racing record

SCCA National Championship Runoffs

American Open-Wheel racing results
(key) (Races in bold indicate pole position, races in italics indicate fastest race lap)

Star Mazda Championship

Complete SCCA Pro Formula Enterprises results

U.S. F2000 National Championship

References

External links
 Official website
 

American racing drivers
1984 births
Indy Pro 2000 Championship drivers
24 Hours of Daytona drivers
Racing drivers from Dayton, Ohio
Living people
SCCA National Championship Runoffs winners
U.S. F2000 National Championship drivers